Finaghy (
 or) is an electoral ward in the Balmoral district of Belfast City Council, Northern Ireland. It is based on the townland of Ballyfinaghy. There has been a small community living in the area since the 17th century, and it has been involved in the production of linen, which was key to the Lagan Valley area at the time.

History
In the 1930s, the community gradually started to grow; the local Presbyterian church was founded in 1936. In the 1950s, the city of Belfast grew outwards. Housing estates were built in Finaghy, including Benmore, Locksley and Erinvale, which caused the population to at least double. Finaghy now refers to the area along the Lisburn Road from the King's Hall to the start of Black's Road and between the Malone Road and the M1 Motorway bridge at Finaghy Road North. The heart of the area is Finaghy crossroads, where the Lisburn Road intersects with Finaghy Road North and Finaghy Road South.

Architectures
Finaghy is home to the first purpose-built National Health Service clinic in the United Kingdom. Unusually, Finaghy has no pubs or betting shops: it was stipulated in land deeds that there were to be no public houses on the land belonging to Ballyfinaghy House, the past residence of Ralph Charley, a wealthy Belfast merchant who made a fortune from the linen industry. Behind the crossroads is the new Finaghy Campus, which houses a freshly built public library, the non-denominational Finaghy Primary School and community playing fields.

Finaghy is home to various Protestant congregations – Presbyterian, Methodist, Church of Ireland, Plymouth Brethren and Baptist and a large Roman Catholic congregation in nearby Dunmurry. Aside from the older Presbyterian Church, which now has a new community centre, there is a relatively modern Methodist Church which has a representation of Jacob's Ladder in its skyline. The Church of Ireland church is dedicated to St. Polycarp. St. Anne's Roman Catholic Parish Church and centre is nestled opposite the top of the Black's Road. St Anne's Roman Catholic Primary School is situated next to it. Behind St. Anne's lies Rathmore Grammar School, a Catholic grammar school.

See also
 Finaghy railway station

External links
Finaghy Primary School official website
St. Anne's Parish official website
Bethany Church official website

References

Electoral wards of Belfast